Rivers South East senatorial district is one of the three senatorial districts in Rivers State, Nigeria. It is currently represented by Barinada Mpigi

District profile
The district covers these local government areas: Andoni, Eleme, Gokana, Khana, Opobo–Nkoro, Oyigbo and Tai. In 2014, it had a projected population of 1,720,790.

Election results

2015

List of senators
Adawari Pepple (1999 – 2003)
Lee Maeba (2003 – 2011)
Magnus Abe (2011 – 2015, 2016 – 2019)
Olaka Nwogu (2015)
Barry Mpigi (2019 - Present)

References

Rivers State senatorial districts